The 1513 Marash earthquake or Maraş earthquake was an major earthquake that happened near Marash in 1513. It followed about 400 years after the 1114 Marash earthquake and after about 500 years was followed by the 2023 Marash earthquake.

The earthquake may have been felt as far as Cairo. A distant earthquake was felt from Cairo on 28 March 1513, however it is not known for certain if this was the same earthquake because some sources put the date of the Marash earthquake at 1514.

The earthquake was associated with rupture along the Pazarcık Segment and its magnitude was estimated at  7.4. The previous major earthquake in this segment was the 1114 Marash earthquake roughly 400 years earlier which was also magnitude 7.4 or higher. With this earthquake now being over 500 years ago, data points towards a massive buildup of pressure in this zone as of 2018, making a next major earthquake in this zone likely. It was recommended to prepare for another earthquake that is magnitude 7.5. The next major earthquake in this zone occurred in February 2023.

References

Sources

16th-century earthquakes
1513
1513 in Asia